Camila Soato (born August 15, 1985) is a Brazilian artist.

Soato was born in Brasília. She has a degree in fine arts from the University of Brasilia. Soato lives and works in Sao Paulo.

In her work, Soato uses traditional oil painting techniques to create satirical images which depict bizarre situations.

Soato has had solo exhibitions in galleries in Rio de Janeiro, Sao Paulo and Brasilia. In 2013, she won the PIPA Prize chosen by popular vote.

References 

1985 births
Living people
21st-century Brazilian women artists
21st-century Brazilian artists
Brazilian contemporary artists
People from Brasília